Arbovale is an unincorporated community in Pocahontas County, West Virginia, United States. Arbovale had a post office, which closed on March 3, 2007.

Arbovale derives its name from Adam Arbogast, who settled in the vale where the town site is situated.

Climate
The climate in this area has mild differences between highs and lows, and there is adequate rainfall year-round.  According to the Köppen Climate Classification system, Arbovale has a marine west coast climate, abbreviated "Cfb" on climate maps.

References

Unincorporated communities in Pocahontas County, West Virginia
Unincorporated communities in West Virginia